Glen Shane Smith (born 22 January 1973 in Bermuda) is a Bermudian cricketer. He is a left-handed batsman. He played in Bermuda's first List A match against the Windward Islands in the 1996 Red Stripe Bowl, scoring 54 runs and winning the man of the match award, but he has not since featured for Bermuda in List A cricket, although he did play in the 1997 ICC Trophy.

References

External links
 Cricket Archive profile
 Cricinfo profile

1973 births
Bermudian cricketers
Living people
People from Hamilton Parish